Charles Moss (1763 – 16 December 1811) was a Church of England bishop, not to be confused with his father Charles Moss (bishop of Bath and Wells). He served as Bishop of Oxford from 1807 to 1811.

Life
He was educated at Sherborne and graduated from Christ Church, Oxford with a BA in 1783 (where he had got to know Lord Grenville), he was appointed to be a prebend and precentor in the diocese of Bath and Wells by his father (then its bishop) along with the livings of Wookey and Castle Cary. He then won the chaplaincy of the House of Commons in 1789 via Grenville, who also gained him the nomination to be Bishop of Oxford in 1807. He was also a Canon of Westminster (1792–1797) and Canon of St Paul's (from 1797). He returned the favour by backing Grenville's campaign to become Chancellor of Oxford University.

References

1763 births
1811 deaths
Anglican clergy from London
People educated at Sherborne School
Alumni of Christ Church, Oxford
Bishops of Oxford